The 1969–70 Carolina Cougars season was the 1st season of the Cougars in the ABA. Late in the spring of 1969, the Houston Mavericks had been bought by the Southern Sports Corporation (headed by James C. Gardner) for $350,000. After the season finished, the team moved to North Carolina, which at the time had no professional teams. The Cougars played in three areas in the state: Greensboro, Charlotte, and Raleigh, making this the first regional franchise in the ABA. The first game of the Cougars was on October 8, 1969, when the Cougars played the Dallas Chaparrals at Greensboro Coliseum, with Carolina winning 108–97. The team finished 3rd in the six team Eastern Division. While they finished last in average points scored per game (106.8), they were 1st in points allowed per game (107). In the Playoffs, the Cougars faced off against the Indiana Pacers (with Game 3 being played in Charlotte and Game 4 played in Raleigh), but the Cougars lost the series in four games.

During the regular season, the Cougars played 20 games in Greensboro, 14 in Charlotte, and 8 in Raleigh; in the playoffs, the team played once in Charlotte, and once in Raleigh.

Roster
 42 Bill Bunting - Small forward
 24 Calvin Fowler - Shooting guard
 33 Steve Kramer - Shooting guard
 23 Gene Littles - Point guard
 35 Randolph Mahaffey - Power forward
 44 Larry Miller - Shooting guard
 34 Doug Moe - Small forward
 52 Rich Niemann - Center
 51 George Peeples - Center
 21 Ron Perry - Guard
 52 George Sutor - Center
 11 Bob Verga - Shooting guard 
 13 Hank Whitney - Power forward

Final standings

Eastern Division

Playoffs 
Eastern Division Semifinals vs Carolina Cougars

Cougars lose series, 4–0

Awards, records, and honors
1970 ABA All-Star Game played on January 24, 1970
 Doug Moe
 Bob Verga

References

 Cougars on Basketball Reference

Carolina
Carolina Cougars
Carolina Cougars, 1969-70
Carolina Cougars, 1969-70